The Maritime Museum at Battleship Cove, formerly the Marine Museum at Fall River in Fall River, Massachusetts, is a historical and nautical museum with memorabilia, artifacts, and ship models of the Fall River Line and RMS Titanic. The museum houses a diverse collection which includes more than 150 scale models, 30,000 photographs, videos, uniforms, audio recordings and more. The museum also hosts a Titanic exhibition, which includes a 28-foot (8.5-meter) long scale model of the RMS Titanic used in Twentieth-Century-Fox's 1953 film Titanic. The museum also houses models of the Fall River Line (which operated from 1847 to 1937), a fleet of steamships that carried passengers from New York City and Boston to summer homes in Newport. Other exhibits follow the history of steam power at sea.  The museum also sponsors a regular program of special events. The museum's main gallery exhibition is entitled: Sails, Paddles, and Screws: the History of Maritime Travel and Culture; and the museum hosts temporary exhibitions as well as a Kid's Cove Fun Space.

Notable items and exhibits
A 28-foot model of RMS Titanic from the 1953 Twentieth Century Fox film
A large scale model of HMS Bounty donated by Turner Broadcasting
Replica rooms from steamships such as those of the Fall River Line
Underwater archaeology exhibit about Robert Ballard's RMS titanic dive
Research Library
Maritime objects from industries such as whaling, United Fruit, the Age of Exploration, and more
Videos and photographs from the Wood's Hole Oceanographic Institution discovery expedition

See also
List of maritime museums in the United States

References

Buildings and structures in Fall River, Massachusetts
History of Bristol County, Massachusetts
Maritime museums in Massachusetts
Museums in Bristol County, Massachusetts
Tourist attractions in Fall River, Massachusetts